Stephanie Siriwardhana  (born 5 February 1988) is a Sri Lankan-Lebanese model and the winner of 2011 Miss Universe Sri Lanka she represented her country at the 2011 Miss Universe pageant. She is also the main host of The Voice Teens Sri Lanka season 1 and 2.

Biography
She was born on 5 February 1988 in Kuwait. Her father is Sri Lankan and her mother is Lebanese. She is the eldest of 4 children, and has 3 younger brothers. When she was 3 years old her family moved to Sri Lanka due to the escalation of Gulf War. After finishing her primary education in Sri Lanka she moved to Italy and then to Canada where she graduated with a degree in Journalism, Communications and Political Science from Concordia University in Montreal.

In July 2011 she won the title of Miss Universe in Sri Lanka and represented  her country at Miss Universe pageant which was held in Brazil on same year. In 2013, she was crowned as Miss Asia Pacific World Sri Lanka.

She is a member of Global Shapers Community, and has worked as a senator of the 2nd Sri Lankan Youth Parliament. Also she is the founder of Stephanie Siriwardhana Foundation, which intends to support a transitional shelter for sexually abused young girls.

Filmography 
In 2013 she appeared in a song of Kannada film Dirty Picture: Silk Sakkath Maga.

References

External links 
Miss Sri Lanka

Sri Lankan female models
Living people
Miss Universe 2011 contestants
Sri Lankan beauty pageant winners
Sinhalese models
Sri Lankan people of Lebanese descent
1988 births